Phostria alberici is a moth in the family Crambidae. It was described by Abel Dufrane in 1945. It is found in the Democratic Republic of the Congo.

References

Phostria
Moths described in 1945
Moths of Africa